Mars 1, also known as 1962 Beta Nu 1, Mars 2MV-4 and Sputnik 23, was an automatic interplanetary station launched in the direction of Mars on November 1, 1962, the first of the Soviet Mars probe program, with the intent of flying by the planet at a distance of about . It was designed to image the surface and send back data on cosmic radiation, micrometeoroid impacts and Mars' magnetic field, radiation environment, atmospheric structure, and possible organic compounds.

After leaving Earth orbit, the spacecraft and the Molniya booster's fourth stage separated and the solar panels were deployed. Early telemetry indicated that there was a leak in one of the gas valves in the orientation system so the spacecraft was transferred to gyroscopic stabilization. It made sixty-one radio transmissions, initially at two-day intervals and later at five days, containing a large amount of interplanetary data. 

Spacecraft design 

The cylinder was divided into two compartments. The upper , the orbital module, contained guidance and on-board propulsion systems. The experiment module, containing the scientific instrumentation, comprised the bottom  of the cylinder. A  parabolic high gain antenna was used for communication, along with an omnidirectional antenna and a semi-directional antenna. Power was supplied by two solar panel wings with a total area of  affixed to opposite sides of the spacecraft. Power was stored in a 42 ampere-hour cadmium-nickel battery.

Communications were via a decimeter-wavelength radio transmitter mounted in the orbital module which used the high-gain antenna. This was supplemented by a 1-metre-wavelength range transmitter through the omnidirectional antenna. An 8-centimetre-wavelength transmitter mounted in the experiment module was designed to transmit the TV images. Also mounted in the experiment module was a 5-centimeter range impulse transmitter. Temperature control was achieved using a binary gas–liquid system and hemispherical radiators mounted on the ends of the solar panels. The craft carried various scientific instruments including a magnetometer probe, television photographic equipment, a spectroreflexometer, radiation sensors (gas-discharge and scintillation counters), a spectrograph to study ozone absorption bands, and a micrometeoroid instrument.

Scientific results 
 Magnetic field intensities of 3–4 nanoteslas (nT, also known as gammas) with peaks as high as 6–9 nT were measured in interplanetary space.
 The solar wind was detected. 
 The radiation zones around Earth were detected, and their magnitude confirmed.

Designation 
This spacecraft is also referenced as Sputnik 23 and Mars 2MV-4. It was originally designated Sputnik 30 in the U.S. Naval Space Command Satellite Situation Summary.

Although it was called Mars 1, there were at least three other probes prior to this, that were failures: Mars 2MV-4 No.1, Mars 1M No.2, and Mars 1M No.1

See also

 Exploration of Mars
 List of missions to Mars
 Marsnik program
 Space exploration
 Unmanned space missions

References 

 Mars 1 (2MV-4 #1, 2)

External links 
 The Soviet Mars program, Professor Chris Mihos, Case Western Reserve University
 , National Space Science, Data Center

Mars program
Derelict space probes
Derelict satellites in heliocentric orbit
Spacecraft launched in 1962
1962 in the Soviet Union
2MV